Jerome L. Davis (September 26, 1917 – April 11, 1991) was an American director, producer and screenwriter. He was nominated for five Primetime Emmy Awards in the categories Outstanding Writing, Outstanding Comedy Series and Outstanding New Series for his work on the television programs The Farmer's Daughters, Bewitched and The Odd Couple. Davis died in April 1991 of a stroke at the Cedars-Sinai Medical Center in Los Angeles, California.

References

External links 

1917 births
1991 deaths
Television producers from New York City
Screenwriters from New York (state)
American male screenwriters
American television writers
American male television writers
American television producers
American television directors